Janni Lund Johansen (born 14 January 1976) is a Danish women's international footballer who plays as a forward. She is a member of the Denmark women's national football team. She was part of the team at the UEFA Women's Euro 1997 and 1999 FIFA Women's World Cup.

References

1976 births
Living people
Danish women's footballers
Denmark women's international footballers
Place of birth missing (living people)
1999 FIFA Women's World Cup players
Women's association football forwards